Mary Lou Williams, alternatively titled Black Christ of the Andes, is a jazz album by pianist Mary Lou Williams, which was released in 1964 by Folkways Records. Released after Williams's conversion to Catholicism, the album incorporates a variety of styles from spirituals, blues and avant-garde jazz. The title track is a choral Mass hymn in honor of the Peruvian saint St. Martin de Porres.

Background 
Following the amendments to the Constitution of Sacred Liturgy by the Second Vatican Council in 1962, Williams was encouraged by her peers in the church to create a work of "sacred jazz."  Williams, who had hardly written or performed since her appearance at the  Newport Jazz Festival in 1957.

Reception and legacy

The album was listed at #140 in Pitchfork's Top 200 Greatest Albums of the 1960s, with critic Seth Colter Walls describing it as 'visionary'. AllMusic singled out Williams' piano solos as a highlight of the album.

Track listing

References 

1964 albums